Zeitschrift für Malakozoologie was a German-language journal for malacology. It was founded by Karl Theodor Menke in 1844. Starting in 1846, Ludwig Karl Georg Pfeiffer and Menke were co-editors-in-chief of the Zeitschrift. There were 10 published volumes. The Zeitschrift was published in 1844–1845 by Hahn'sche Hofbuchhandlung in Hannover and then in 1846–1853 by T. Fischer in Cassel. Publication was continued in 1854 under the title Malakozoologische Blätter until cessation with the last volume in 1891.

References

External links
Zeitschrift für Malakozoologie | Hathi Trust Digital Library

Monthly journals
German-language journals
Malacology journals
Publications established in 1844
Publications disestablished in 1891